Ian Gordon Lythgoe  (30 December 1914 – 16 February 2000) was a Chairman of the State Services Commission in New Zealand. He was an accountant.

In the 1975 New Year Honours, Lythgoe was appointed a Companion of the Order of the Bath.

References

1914 births
2000 deaths
New Zealand public servants
New Zealand Companions of the Order of the Bath